In physics, power is the amount of energy transferred or converted per unit time. In the International System of Units, the unit of power is the watt, equal to one joule per second. In older works, power is sometimes called activity. Power is a scalar quantity.

Power is related to other quantities; for example, the power involved in moving a ground vehicle is the product of the aerodynamic drag plus traction force on the wheels, and the velocity of the vehicle. The output power of a motor is the product of the torque that the motor generates and the angular velocity of its output shaft.  Likewise, the power dissipated in an electrical element of a circuit is the product of the current flowing through the element and of the voltage across the element.

Definition
Power is the rate with respect to time at which work is done; it is the time derivative of work:

In this case, power can be written as:

If instead the force is variable over a three-dimensional curve C, then the work is expressed in terms of the line integral:

From the fundamental theorem of calculus, we know that  Hence the formula is valid for any general situation.

Units
The dimension of power is energy divided by time. In the International System of Units (SI), the unit of power is the watt (W), which is equal to one joule per second. Other common and traditional measures are horsepower (hp), comparing to the power of a horse; one mechanical horsepower equals about 745.7 watts. Other units of power include ergs per second (erg/s), foot-pounds per minute, dBm, a logarithmic measure relative to a reference of 1 milliwatt, calories per hour, BTU per hour (BTU/h), and tons of refrigeration.

Average power
As a simple example, burning one kilogram of coal releases much more energy than detonating a kilogram of TNT, but because the TNT reaction releases energy much more quickly, it delivers far more power than the coal.
If   is the amount of work performed during a period of time of duration , the average power  over that period is given by the formula

It is the average amount of work done or energy converted per unit of time. The average power is often simply called "power" when the context makes it clear.

The instantaneous power is then the limiting value of the average power as the time interval  approaches zero.

In the case of constant power , the amount of work performed during a period of duration  is given by

Mechanical power

Power in mechanical systems is the combination of forces and movement. In particular, power is the product of a force on an object and the object's velocity, or the product of a torque on a shaft and the shaft's angular velocity.

Mechanical power is also described as the time derivative of work.  In mechanics, the work done by a force  on an object that travels along a curve  is given by the line integral:

If the force  is derivable from a potential (conservative), then applying the gradient theorem (and remembering that force is the negative of the gradient of the potential energy) yields:

The power at any point along the curve  is the time derivative:

In one dimension, this can be simplified to:

In rotational systems, power is the product of the torque  and angular velocity ,

where  measured in radians per second.  The  represents scalar product.

Mechanical advantage
If a mechanical system has no losses, then the input power must equal the output power. This provides a simple formula for the mechanical advantage of the system.

Let the input power to a device be a force  acting on a point that moves with velocity  and the output power be a force  acts on a point that moves with velocity .  If there are no losses in the system, then

and the mechanical advantage of the system (output force per input force) is given by

If there are no losses in the system, then

which yields the mechanical advantage

These relations are important because they define the maximum performance of a device in terms of velocity ratios determined by its physical dimensions.  See for example gear ratios.

Electrical power

The instantaneous electrical power P delivered to a component is given by

where 
 is the instantaneous power, measured in watts (joules per second),
 is the potential difference (or voltage drop) across the component, measured in volts, and
 is the current through it, measured in amperes.

If the component is a resistor with time-invariant voltage to current ratio, then:

where

is the electrical resistance, measured in ohms.

Peak power and duty cycle

In the case of a periodic signal  of period , like a train of identical pulses, the instantaneous power  is also a periodic function of period .  The peak power is simply defined by:

The peak power is not always readily measurable, however, and the measurement of the average power  is more commonly performed by an instrument.  If one defines the energy per pulse as

then the average power is

One may define the pulse length  such that  so that the ratios

are equal. These ratios are called the duty cycle of the pulse train.

Radiant power
Power is related to intensity at a radius ; the power emitted by a source can be written as:

See also
 Simple machines
 Orders of magnitude (power)
 Pulsed power
 Intensity – in the radiative sense, power per area
 Power gain – for linear, two-port networks
 Power density
 Signal strength
 Sound power

References

 
Force
Temporal rates
Physical quantities